Jadiel Chance (born 8 August 1999) is a professional football player from St. Vincent and the Grenadines who plays as a goalkeeper for the St. Vincent and the Grenadines national team.

He debuted internationally on 11 May 2018, in his youth U-20 team at the 2018 CONCACAF U-20 Championship qualifying game held in the United States against the US Virgin Islands in a 3–0 victory.

He made his senior debut at the CONCACAF Nations League match against non-FIFA member Bonaire in a 2–1 victory. Chance had also appeared at the 2022 FIFA World Cup qualifiers.

References

1999 births
Living people
Saint Vincent and the Grenadines footballers
Saint Vincent and the Grenadines international footballers
Association football goalkeepers